Arcturos can refer to:

Arcturos (mythology), guardian of Arcadian and Callisto in Greek mythology
Environmental Centre ARCTUROS, a Greek ecological organization focusing on saving the brown bear and its habitats